School District 40 New Westminster is a school district based in New Westminster, British Columbia, Canada.

The school board serves the city of New Westminster, including the neighbourhood of Queensborough on Lulu Island.

Schools
New Westminster has a single secondary school, New Westminster Secondary School, three middle schools, and ten elementary schools.

External links
 School District 40 New Westminster

Education in New Westminster
40